How Do You Solve a Problem Like Maria? was a Canadian reality competition television series that aired on CBC Television. It premiered on June 15, 2008 at 8pm EDT, and concluded on July 28, 2008. The show is based on the series of the same name which aired on BBC One in the United Kingdom in 2006. The Canadian version was cancelled after one season.

The premise of the contest was to find a musical theatre performer to play the lead role of Maria von Trapp in the 2008 Andrew Lloyd Webber and David Mirvish revival of Rodgers and Hammerstein's The Sound of Music at the Princess of Wales Theatre in Toronto. Initial auditions were held in seven Canadian cities. The show was hosted by Gavin Crawford and featured Simon Lee, Elaine Overholt, and John Barrowman as the judges for the show.

The first episode of the show featured the top 50 auditioners at the show's Maria School being cut to 20. The second episode had the Marias performing in front of Lloyd Webber in London, and then the 20 were cut to 10 with his input. Beginning June 22, the Marias performed live in Toronto every Sunday night with a live orchestra. The voting results aired on the following night.

Finalists
Ten contestants made it through the audition rounds and performed during the live shows.

* at the start of the contest

Results summary

Live shows
The live shows saw the finalists eliminated one by one following both individual and group performances. Once eliminated, the leaving contestant ended the program by leading a performance of "So Long, Farewell" from The Sound of Music with the remaining contestants.

Week 1 (June 22, 2008)
Following the first week of the competition, Alison was the first Maria to be eliminated from the competition. The show performances were:

Group performances:
"How Do You Solve A Problem Like Maria?" (from the musical The Sound of Music)
"I Have Confidence" (from the musical The Sound of Music)

Sing-Off

Week 2 (June 29, 2008)
As the mission for this week, the potential Marias had to prove how fit they are by taking part in a thorough workout.

For their individual performances, the contestants sang songs by Canadian artists to celebrate Canada Day.

The show performances were:

Group performances:
"My Favorite Things" (from the musical The Sound of Music)
"Ain't No Mountain High Enough" (Marvin Gaye & Tammi Terrell)

Sing-Off

Week 3 (July 6, 2008)
For their individual performances, the contestants sang songs from the musicals.

The show performances were:

Group performances:
"Do-Re-Mi" (from the musical The Sound of Music)
"Seasons of Love" (from the musical Rent)

Sing-Off

Week 4 (July 13, 2008)
As the mission for this week, the contestants act with the children to help separate between the potential Marias.

The show performances were:

Group performances:
"The Lonely Goatherd" (from the musical The Sound of Music)
"Don't Rain on My Parade" (from the musical Funny Girl)

Sing-Off

Week 5 (July 20, 2008)
This week, just like the British version, the mission was a chemistry test with John Barrowman, which involved his giving the Marias a surprise kiss.

The show performances were:

Group performances:
"I Have Confidence" (from the musical The Sound of Music)
"It's a Grand Night for Singing" (from the musical State Fair)
"Sway" (The Pussycat Dolls)

Sing-Off

Week 6 (July 27, 2008)
For their individual performances, the contestants sang songs by Andrew Lloyd Webber.

The show performances were:

Group performances:
Finalists: "Anything You Can Do" (from the musical Annie Get Your Gun)
Finalists: "My Favorite Things" (from the musical The Sound of Music)
Finalists and former Marias: "How Do You Solve A Problem Like Maria?" (from the musical The Sound of Music)
Elicia and Janna: "The Sound of Music" (from The Sound of Music)

After being announced as the season winner, Elicia concluded the season with a performance of "The Sound of Music".

After the show
Elicia MacKenzie won the most votes, as announced prematurely on the Canadian Press wire at 7:30pm, July 28, half an hour before the show aired in the Toronto area.

On August 14, 2008 it was announced that runner-up, Janna Polzin, had been cast as an "alternate Maria" for the Toronto stage production. Janna played Maria twice a week (Wednesday evenings and Saturday matinees), while Elicia will perform the role six times weekly (Tuesday evenings, Wednesday matinees, Thursday through Saturday evenings and Sunday matinees).

Some viewers of the show have claimed that the panel and Lloyd Webber favoured Janna over the other performers in the competition. However, Elicia MacKenzie ended up beating Janna in the final.

References

External links
Official Program Website at cbc.ca
TV, eh?
 

2000s Canadian reality television series
2008 Canadian television series debuts
2008 Canadian television series endings
CBC Television original programming
Music competitions in Canada
Singing talent shows
The Sound of Music
Television series by Temple Street Productions